Flyingshot Lake, or Flyingshot Lake Settlement, is an unincorporated community in Alberta, Canada within the County of Grande Prairie No. 1 that is recognized as a designated place by Statistics Canada. It surrounds a lake of the same name, and is adjacent to the City of Grande Prairie to the northeast.

Demographics 

See also 
List of communities in Alberta
List of designated places in Alberta
List of settlements in Alberta

References 

Designated places in Alberta
Localities in the County of Grande Prairie No. 1
Settlements in Alberta